The Henry Franks House is a private house located at 535 Ely Street in Allegan, Michigan. It was added to the National Register of Historic Places in 1987.

History
The Henry Franks House was built in about 1860. It was likely moved from the downtown area to its present location in the late 19th century.

Description
The Henry Franks House is a two-story frame Greek Revival upright and wing house with clapboard siding. It has a wide, continuous band beneath the cornice and corner pilasters rising to meet it. Porches with square columns are constructed in a similar style.

References

Houses on the National Register of Historic Places in Michigan
Greek Revival architecture in Michigan
Houses completed in 1860
Allegan County, Michigan